Plectophloeus is a genus of beetles belonging to the family Staphylinidae.

The species of this genus are found in Europe.

Species:
 Plectophloeus binaghii Besuchet, 1964 
 Plectophloeus carpathicus (Reitter, 1882)

References

Staphylinidae
Staphylinidae genera